Livio Pin (born January 23, 1953 in Cappella Maggiore, Italy) was a professional footballer who during his career played for Perugia, Napoli, Udinese, Bologna and Żurrieq, throughout his career he played as a midfielder.

References

External links
Career statistics at emozionecalcio.it 

Living people
1953 births
Italian footballers
Italian expatriate footballers
Serie A players
A.C. Perugia Calcio players
S.S.C. Napoli players
Udinese Calcio players
Bologna F.C. 1909 players
Żurrieq F.C. players

Association football midfielders